Knema intermedia is a species of plant in the family Myristicaceae. It is found in Sumatra, Peninsular Malaysia, Singapore, Java and Borneo.

References

intermedia
Trees of Malaya
Trees of Borneo
Trees of Java
Trees of Sumatra
Near threatened flora of Asia
Taxonomy articles created by Polbot